Özçelik is a Turkish surname. Notable people with the surname include:

 Ercan Özçelik (born 1967), Turkish-German actor
 Gamze Özçelik (born 1982), Turkish actress, model and TV hostess
 Okan Özçelik (born 1992), Turkish footballer
 Özlem Özçelik (born 1972), Turkish volleyball player
 Silhan Özçelik (born c. 1996), British girl arrested in London after travelling to Syria

Turkish-language surnames